James Kasper (born May 17, 1945) is an American politician. He is a member of the North Dakota House of Representatives from the 46th District, serving since 2000. He is a member of the Republican Party.

In February 2019, Kasper praised Bismarck mayor Steve Bakken as "sort of a redneck" in a debate on the House floor, which Bakken took "as a badge of honor."

References

Living people
1945 births
Republican Party members of the North Dakota House of Representatives
21st-century American politicians
Politicians from Fargo, North Dakota